AFCI may refer to:

 Association of Film Commissioners International
 Advanced Fuel Cycle Initiative
 Arc-fault circuit interrupter